Red Horse Etheridge was an American Negro league pitcher in the 1910s.

Etheridge played for the Chicago American Giants and the Leland Giants in 1911. In six recorded appearances on the mound, he posted a 4.20 ERA over 40.2 innings.

References

External links
Baseball statistics and player information from Baseball-Reference Black Baseball Stats and Seamheads

Year of birth missing
Year of death missing
Place of birth missing
Place of death missing
Chicago American Giants players
Leland Giants players
Baseball pitchers